Clazziquai Project, also known as Clazziquai, is a South Korean electropop band that combines several genres including electronic music, acid jazz and house. The band's first short unofficial albums were released online in 2001, spreading its music through words of "netizens," who positively received the band's music. They remained underground until the release of their first album Instant Pig in 2004, selling over 80,000 copies. Since then, their music has been used in shows, commercials, and films.

Clazziquai is known for their songs, "Be My Love" and "She Is", which were featured on the Korean drama My Lovely Samsoon, with the former becoming the show's theme song. The band won an award at the MNET KM Music Video Festival for "Best Soundtrack", and has also been the most nominated band at the Korean Popular Music Awards II(2회), winning "Artist of the Year" and "Best Pop". They have contributed to works by Japanese artists Fantastic Plastic Machine and M-Flo.

History

2001: Formation
DJ Clazzi, described as "a magician at synthesizing different sounds in music into creating one unique [sic] new genre". graduated from Capilano College, and continued his study at Centre for Digital Imaging and Sound (CDIS). After his graduation, he worked as a web designer, uploading his music online during his leisure time. DJ Clazzi's music became popular on Korean social media, with the experimental nature of his music being well received by Korean netizens, which is the reason why Clazziquai was initially labeled a "project group".

Korean-Canadian siblings Alex and Christina Chu were initially acquaintances with DJ Clazzi and participated vocally on the first three short and experimental albums released online, named gray, red, and retro.

Christina Chu left the official line up and Horan stepped in to fill her spot. Chu occasionally contributes her vocals to the band, although she is often an uncredited guest artist.

2004–2006: Instant Pig and Color Your Soul
Clazziquai released their first studio album, Instant Pig, in May 2004. The album received critical acclaim, which led to more than five songs from the album being used in six television commercials. The remixed English version of the song, "Come To Me", in its remix album Zbam was released in November 2004, and was later used as a song in a television commercial featuring David Beckham. Fantastic Plastic Machine praised Clazziquai as a new band to lead the "Hallyu".

In 2005, Clazziquai's "Be My Love" and "She Is", were featured in the South Korean hit television drama, My Lovely Samsoon. These two major theme songs also raised the ratings of the series up 50%. Clazziquai had hoped then that people's imagination towards their music would not 'decrease as a result of their unexpected popularity'. In September 2005, Clazziquai released their second album, Color Your Soul claiming it had a "raw, funkier feel presenting a combination of electronic music and [an] emphasized acoustic genre". A remix album entitled Pinch Your Soul was released early the following year.

2007–2009: Love Child of the Century and Mucho Punk
In June 2007, Clazziquai's third album, Love Child of the Century, was released. A remix album, Robotica, was released later in the year. After the album's release, the members of Clazziquai grew busy with their own work, which started false rumors that Clazziquai could be disbanding.

In 2008, a video game for the PlayStation Portable featuring many Clazziquai songs titled DJ Max Portable Clazziquai Edition was released. These songs were later released as part of the special album Metrotronics.

In July 2009, Clazziquai released their fourth album, Mucho Punk, featuring the single "Wizard of OZ" which had been featured in an LG commercial that year. In concordance to Mucho Punk, Clazziquai released Japanese album, Mucho Musica, and later released a remix album, Mucho Mix. The remix version of the original album was released in South Korea later in the year as Mucho Beat.

2012–2018: Blessed, Blink and Travellers
In December 2012, Clazziquai released the single, "Can't Go On My Own", as part of the Can We Get Married? OST. In February 2013, the band released their fifth album, Blessed, making it into the top ten of Gaon's weekly album chart. They later held three 'Be Blessed' concerts throughout May and June.

In September 2014, Clazziquai released their sixth album, Blink. They held a concert shortly after the release to celebrate their tenth anniversary as a band. In mid 2015, they held a concert at the Understage in Seoul.

In September 2016, Clazziquai released their seventh album, Travellers. After the album's release the band held a concert at the Blue Square in Seoul.

2019-present: Recent activities 

On September 10, 2019, the band released a brand new single, called What If featuring Kim Soo-young. In the accompanying press release, it was mentioned that Clazziquai will continue the collaboration project with various singers starting with the respective single.

Members
 DJ Clazzi (DJ 클래지) — Leader, composition, production, vocals
 Alex (알렉스) — Vocals
 Horan (호란) — Vocals

Discography

Studio albums

Remix albums

Special albums

Singles

Soundtrack appearances

Awards and nominations

Mnet Asian Music Awards

References

External links
 

South Korean electronic music groups
South Korean co-ed groups
Acid jazz ensembles
House music groups
Musical groups established in 2001
Avex Group artists
Universal Music Japan artists
MAMA Award winners
Korean Music Award winners